Dean Perrett  is an Australian Traditional Country Singer / Songwriter from Queensland, Australia.

 Dean is one of Australia's Leading Traditional Country and Bush Ballad Artists, He recorded his first album in 1989 and in the following 25 years he has released 12 more albums.

Dean has toured internationally and regularly performs at the Tamworth Country Music Festival and other various festivals and gigs.

Albums 
{| class="wikitable"
!Title
!Details
|-
|Australia She's Mine
| 
 Released: 1989
|-
|Kings in Grass Castles
|
 Released: 1999
 Label: LBS Records (LBS039CD)
|-
|The Real Thing
|
 Released: 2001
 Label: LBS Records (LBS058CD)
|-
|All Set & Saddled
|
 Released: 2003
 Label: LBS Records (LBS077CD)
|-
|Keep on the Sunnyside
|
 Released: 2004
 Label: 
|-
|My Saddle Bag Dreams
|
 Released: 2005
 Label: Kross Kut Records (KKR107CD)
|-
|New Traditions
|
 Released: 2006
 Label: Dean Perrett (DPE001)
|-
|Return of the Stockman
|
 Released: 2007
 Label: Dean Perrett 
|-
|A Thousand Campfires
|
 Released: 2008
 Label: Dean Perrett
|-
|Cattle Town
|
 Released: November 2011
 Label: Dean Perrett
|-
|My Bush Heritage
|
 Released: 2013
 Label: Dean Perrett
|-
|The Shelter of the Cross
|
 Released: 2013
 Label: Dean Perrett
|-
|I'm the Land
|
 Released: July 2014
 Label: Dean Perrett (DPE007)
|-
|Dusty Sky
|
 Released: January 2016
 Label: Dean Perrett, Checked Label
|-
|Aussie Favourites Bluegrassed
|
 Released: March 2017
 Label: Dean Perrett, Checked Label
|-
|Earn Your Spurs
|
 Released: August 2018
 Label: Dean Perrett, Checked Label
|-
|Kind Seasons
|
 Released: February 2021
 Label: Dean Perrett, Checked Label
|-

Awards and nominations

Country Music Awards of Australia
The Country Music Awards of Australia (CMAA) (also known as the Golden Guitar Awards) is an annual awards night held in January during the Tamworth Country Music Festival, celebrating recording excellence in the Australian country music industry. They have been held annually since 1973.
 (wins only)
|-
| 2012
| "Channel Country Ground" (by Dean Perrett & Lee Kernaghan) 
| Bush Ballad of the Year
| 
|-
| 2015
| "My Country, My Land" (by Dean Perrett & Troy Cassar-Daley) 
| Vocal Collaboration of the Year
| 
|-
| 2015
| "Bloodwood & Clover" by Dean Perrett 
| Bush Ballad of the Year
| 
|-
| 2015
| himself
| Hands of Fame
| 
|-
| 2018
| "Henbury Blues" by Dean Perrett 
| Bush Ballad of the Year
| 
|-
| 2021
| "Six decks to Darwin" by Dean Perrett 
| Bush Ballad of the Year
| 
|-
| 2023
| "Out on Killarney" by Dean Perrett 
| Bush Ballad of the Year
| 
|-

Tamworth Songwriters Awards
The Tamworth Songwriters Association (TSA) is an annual songwriting contest for original country songs, awarded in January at the Tamworth Country Music Festival. They commenced in 1986. Dean Perrett has won eleven awards.
 (wins only)
|-
| 2002
| "The Shelter of the Cross" by Dean Perrett
| Gospel Song of the Year
| 
|-
| 2004
| "Hold On to Jesus" by Dean Perrett
| Gospel Song of the Year
| 
|-
|rowspan="2"|  2005
|rowspan="2"|  "No Greater Friend" by Dean Perrett
| Gospel Song of the Year
| 
|-
| Country Song of the Year
| 
|-
| 2011
| "The Shepherd's Fold" by Dean Perrett
| Gospel Song of the Year
| 
|-
| 2012
| "There's Room at the Cross" by Dean Perrett and Sherry Foster
| Gospel Song of the Year
| 
|-
|rowspan="2"| 2014
|rowspan="2"| "Hilda's Rest" by Dean Perrett
| Country Song of the Year
| 
|-
| Country Ballad of the Year
| 
|-
|rowspan="3"| 2015
| "Coopers Creek" by Dean Perrett
| Traditional Bush Ballad of the Year
| 
|-
| "Fear God" by Dean Perrett
| Alt. Blues and Bluegrass of the Year
| 
|-
| "The Lighthouse" by Dean Perrett
| Gospel Song of the Year
| 
|-

References 

Australian country singers
Living people
Year of birth missing (living people)